Decio W. Trovati (16 October 1906 – 21 June 1968) was an Italian ice hockey player. He competed in the men's tournament at the 1936 Winter Olympics.

References

External links
 

1906 births
1968 deaths
Ice hockey players at the 1936 Winter Olympics
Olympic ice hockey players of Italy
Sportspeople from Genoa